The Association for the Defense of Nature (ADN) was founded in 1986 as a result of the concern of a group of people for the environment. It is a non-governmental organization that aims to protect and study nature in Andorra. The ADN pursues its aims through three basic lines of action: conservation, study and information.

Conservation 
ADN carries out direct action of nature conservation: 
 Promotes planning to streamline the human presence (industrial, tourism, etc.) In the Valleys of Andorra.
 Work for the creation of protected natural areas, suggesting areas, management measures, ways of sustainable use, etc..
 Vigil for the safeguarding of endangered species, both animal and vegetable.
 Claim effective solutions to the problems of pollution and waste.
 Collaborate with other institutions to create, adapt and apply the laws of environmental protection.

Study 
ADN contributes to research on the environment and this protection: 
 Promotes and develops scientific basis for conservation actions and proposals.
 Learn lesser known natural elements of our country, analyzing the situation and proposing measures for their protection.

Information 
The ADN is to discover and appreciate nature and therefore:
 Organizers:
Check educational tours to the mountain and protected natural areas 
Conferences, symposia and debates. 
Shares of environmental education with a solid scientific basis, in coordination with other institutions.

 Edit and spreads:
Informative publications on the natural heritage of Andorra and the need to preserve it. 
The periodical "Aigüerola".

Collaboration 
It is affiliate to BirdLife International. BirdLife is the largest world organization for the study and protection of birds and their habitats.

Maintains contact and exchanges with many international organizations with similar objectives.

Participates and organizes symposia and international conferences.

References

External links

Nature conservation organisations based in Europe
Environment of Andorra
Organisations based in Andorra
Ecology of the Pyrenees
Environmental organizations established in 1986
1986 establishments in Andorra